Melanocephalus (fem.: melanocephala; n.: melanocephalum) is an epithet often used as the second word of a binomial name. It derives from Greek words meaning 'black-headed'. It is used in the names of the following species:

Mammals
 Black-headed uakari, Cacajao melanocephalus

Birds
 Arabian partridge, Alectoris melanocephala
 Black turnstone, Arenaria melanocephala
 Black-headed berryeater, Carpornis melanocephala
 Black-headed bunting, Emberiza melanocephala
 Black-headed grosbeak, Pheucticus melanocephalus
 Black-headed heron, Ardea melanocephala
 Black-headed ibis, Threskiornis melanocephalus
 Black-headed oriole, Icterus melanocephalus
 Black-headed parrot, Pionites melanocephala
 Black-headed trogon, Trogon melanocephalus
 Black-headed weaver, Ploceus melanocephalus
 Black-throated barbet, Tricholaema melanocephala
 Chatham Island bellbird, Anthornis melanocephala
 Mediterranean gull, Larus melanocephalus
 Noisy miner, Manorina melanocephala
 Red-backed fairywren, Malurus melanocephalus
 Sardinian warbler, Sylvia melanocephala
 Spectacled whitestart, Myioborus melanocephalus
 Spot-breasted plover, Vanellus melanocephalus
 Western tragopan, Tragopan melanocephalus

Reptiles
 Black-headed python, Aspidites melanocephalus
 Rhynchocalamus melanocephalus
 Black-headed bushmaster, Lachesis melanocephala
 Black-headed dwarf chamaeleon, Bradypodion melanocephalum

Fish
 Redtail filefish, Pervagor melanocephalus
 Largesnout goby, Awaous melanocephalus

Insects

Beetles

Calathus melanocephalus, a ground beetle
Cercyon melanocephalus, a beetle
Cyclocephala melanocephala, a beetle
Dermestes melanocephalus, a beetle
Dromius melanocephalus, a ground beetle
Galeruca melanocephala, a leaf beetle
Lasioderma melanocephalum, a beetle
Paramecosoma melanocephalum, a beetle
Parazuphium melanocephalum, a beetle

True bugs
 Arocatus melanocephalus, a lygaeid bug
Cymus melanocephalus, a lygaeid bug

True files

Wyeomyia melanocephala, a mosquito

Hymenopterans

Neivamyrmex melanocephalus, an ant
Odynerus melanocephalus, a potter wasp
Tapinoma melanocephalum, an ant

Butterflies and moths

Sesia melanocephala, a hornet moth

Molluscs
Krynickillus melanocephalus, a slug

Crustaceans
 Ligia melanocephala, Ligidium melanocephalum or Zia melanocephala, all of which are synonyms of Ligidium hypnorum

Vascular plants
 Blackhead fleabane, Erigeron melanocephalus
 the hawkweed Hieracium melanocephalum

Fungi
 Puccinia melanocephala, a rust

See also
 Animals named as black-legged